Rudolf Graf von Marogna-Redwitz (15 October 1886 – 12 October 1944) was a Colonel of the Wehrmacht, member of the German Resistance in Nazi Germany and the 20 July Plot against Adolf Hitler at the Wolf's Lair in East Prussia.

Early life

Born in Munich, Rudolf Graf von Marogna-Redwitz completed his training to be a career officer in the German Imperial Army. He worked initially in a successor organization to military counterintelligence after the First World War.

In the 1920s he became acquainted with Claus Schenk von Stauffenberg at the Reichswehr Reiterregiment 17 in Bamberg.

Nazi Germany and the Second World War

In 1935, he was transferred to the Abwehr of Wilhelm Canaris and was sent to Vienna in 1938, where he served as the Chief of the counterintelligence office aka Abwehr department Vienna. Marogna-Redwitz cooperated with the catholic-conservative parts of resistance in Austria. After Canaris was disbanded out of office in early 1944, Marogna-Redwitz was transferred to the Army High Command in Berlin at the instigation of Friedrich Olbricht.

Among those who worked for him was Lieutenant Colonel Werner Schrader.

Marogna-Redwitz belonged to the tight circle with the brothers Claus Graf Schenk von Stauffenberg and Berthold Graf Schenk von Stauffenberg and was scheduled as the plotter's liaison officer in Vienna.

20 July Bomb Plot

On 20 July 1944, while in Vienna, he contacted the Austrian Politicians Karl Seitz and Josef Reither and took action against local Nazis but was soon arrested by the Gestapo, he was sentenced to death by the Volksgerichtshof or the People's Court on  12 October 1944 and hanged at Plötzensee Prison in Berlin the same day.

Personal life

Marogna-Redwitz was married to Anna Gräfin von Arco-Zinneberg and had one daughter and two sons.

Notes

External links
 Plötzensee Prison
 

1886 births
1944 deaths
Military personnel from Munich
Abwehr personnel of World War II
Executed members of the 20 July plot
People from Bavaria executed at Plötzensee Prison
People executed by hanging at Plötzensee Prison
People from the Kingdom of Bavaria
German Army personnel of World War I
German Army officers of World War II
Counts of Germany
Military personnel of Bavaria